East Feliciana Public Schools is a school district headquartered in Clinton, Louisiana, United States. The district serves students in East Feliciana Parish.

School uniforms
The district requires all students to wear school uniforms.

Schools

High school (Grades 9-12)
 East Feliciana High School  (Jackson)

Principal:  Karen Williams-Ross

Middle school (Grades 7-8)
 East Feliciana Middle School (Clinton)
Principal: Kimberly Jackson

Elementary schools (Grades Pre-K-6)
 Clinton Elementary School (Clinton)
Principal:  Laron McCurry
 Jackson Elementary School (Jackson)
Principal:  Megan Phillips
 Slaughter Elementary School (Slaughter)
Principal:  Jennifer Thornton

Alternative programs

 East Feliciana Enrichment Academy (Clinton)
Principal: Ella Philson

 East Feliciana STEAM Academy (6th Grade)(Clinton)
Principal: Kim Glascock

Charter school (Grades 7-12)
 Slaughter Community Charter School  (Slaughter)
Principal:  Stephanie Goudeau

School culture
In 2010, State Superintendent of Education Paul Pastorek led staff and school board members from the Saint Helena Parish School Board on a bus tour that included stops at Jackson Elementary School and East Feliciana Middle School.  The purpose of the tour was to help Saint Helena replicate the success of what Pastorek described as "high-quality, high-performing schools."

In December 2014, local television station WBRZ further recognized the outstanding climate and culture of East Feliciana Public Schools when they highlighted Jackson Elementary School as a WBRZ "Cool School."

In October 2021, the Louisiana Department of Education recognized East Feliciana Public Schools' EF Accelerate Summer Learning Program as a Model of Excellence. Later that year, three East Feliciana Public Schools teachers were among eight educators statewide recognized as Exemplary Educators by the Louisiana Department of Education

Student achievement
During the 2012-13 school year, East Feliciana Public Schools ranked second in the state in proficiency growth on the 3rd-8th grade Louisiana Educational Assessment Program (LEAP) and integrated Louisiana Educational Assessment Program (iLEAP) spring assessments.

During the 2016-17 school year, East Feliciana Public Schools ranked first in the state among all school districts for growth in ACT scores.

Notable graduates
Kendell Beckwith

Danny Johnson (American football)

References

External links

 East Feliciana Parish Public School System

School districts in Louisiana
Public School System